Patrick Lee is a Chinese business magnate and the founder of Lee & Man Paper, a large industrial packaging corporation based in Hong Kong.  Lee created the company in 1994.

References

External links
Lee & Man Paper Manufacturing Limited

Living people
Year of birth missing (living people)
People from Qionghai